Tatyana Vladimirovna Felgenhauer (born January 6, 1985) is a Russian journalist, correspondent and presenter of Echo of Moscow radio station, and its deputy editor-in-chief.

Biography
She received the Moscow Prize in the field of journalism in 2010 (along with Matvey Ganapolsky).

The participant of the protest actions against the falsification of the elections in Bolotnaya Square and Sakharov Avenue, covered the events on the air of the radio station.

On October 23, 2017, a man with a knife forced his entry into the building of the Echo of Moscow radio station and wounded Felgenhauer in the neck. The attacker was a native of Georgia Boris Grits, a 48-year-old with dual Russian and Israeli citizenship. A report on Russian television during the month accused the radio station, and Felgenhauer directly, of working to benefit foreign interests in Russia. Police treated the attack as an attempted murder.

During the CPJ International Press Freedom Awards ceremony actress Meryl Streep stated on stage that she admired the work of Tatyana Felgenhauer, Julia Ioffe and Masha Gessen.

In December 2018, she was included in Times Person of the Year 2018, as one of The Guardians,  a collection of journalists from around the world in their fight for the  War on Truth.

She left Russia and moved to Vilnius in 2022. Since August of the same year, she has been a co-host (with Alexander Plyushchev) of DW News, a daily program on Deutsche Welle's Russian-language YouTube channel.

On 21 October 2022, Felgenhauer was included in the Russian list of foreign agents.

Family

Born with the surname Shadrina, the military analyst Pavel Felgenhauer is her stepfather.

She is divorced and has no children.

References

External links

 
 Tatyana Felgenhauer at the Echo of Moscow website (in Russian)

1985 births
Living people
Russian people of German descent
Russian journalists
Echo of Moscow radio presenters
2011–2013 Russian protests
Russian victims of crime
Russian women journalists
21st-century Russian journalists
People listed in Russia as foreign agents